Buffalo Run is a stream located entirely within Ritchie County, West Virginia.

Buffalo Run was so named by Native Americans after the buffalo, which was hunted in the area until the 1790s.

See also
List of rivers of West Virginia

References

Rivers of Ritchie County, West Virginia
Rivers of West Virginia